Gavril Tanasov Zanetov was a lawyer, historian, publicist and literary critic. He was a close associate and adviser to Prime Minister Vasil Radoslavov.

He graduated from the Bolhrad High School of Law and Law at the University of Odessa. He works as a magistrate. Court of Appeal in Sofia.

Zanetov was author of a number of books, studios and publications on historical and ethnographic issues. He contributed to most Bulgarian periodicals from the late 19th century and early 20th century.  He was committed to the cause of the Bulgarian origin of the population along the Velika Morava river valley.

Notes 

1863 births
1934 deaths
20th-century Bulgarian historians
Bulgarian judges
Odesa University alumni
Bulgarian literary critics
Members of the Bulgarian Academy of Sciences
Gagauz people
19th-century Bulgarian historians